Kamran Tessori (Urdu: کامران ٹیسوری) is a Pakistani politician and businessman, currently serving as the Governor of Sindh since 9 October 2022. Tessori is a member of the Muttahida Qaumi Movement – Pakistan party.

Personal life
Tessori is an ethnic muhajir, and belongs to the Tessori family, who runs an international gold business called "Tessori Gold". He is the only politician in his family.

Political career
He established contacts with Arbab Ghulam Rahim who was the Chief Minister of Sindh at the time in order to enter politics. He was later considered a close aide to him.

Arrest
He was arrested in 2008 for being involved in a real estate land scam. The land which was 80 acres and a historical graveyard, was allegedly allotted to him by Arbab Ghulam Rahim who was the 27th Chief Minister of Sindh at the time to build a new housing society called Gold City. He escaped police custody during a shootout while he was being shifted from Karachi to Badin, which led to another case being filed against him.

Controversies
In 2017, a member of MQM-P Faisal Subzwari said that the party (MQM-P) was not for sale, implying that Tessori who is a wealthy businessman involved in gold & commercial real estate businesses, tried using his money to influence party decisions in order to receive a ticket in the Senate.

External links 

 Official Website – Governor of Sindh

References 

Governors of Sindh
Politicians from Karachi
Pakistani Muslims
Living people
Businesspeople from Karachi
1974 births
Pakistani politicians convicted of crimes
Corruption in Pakistan